Kitsune is the first EP from American rock band Marriages. It was released on May 1, 2012, by Sargent House. The EP title "Kitsune" is also the name for a fox spirit in Japanese folklore. The EP cover depicts a woman transforming into a fox spirit and back again.

Track listing

Personnel
Kitsune album personnel adapted from AllMusic.

Dave Clifford – drums, additional guitar on "Pelt" 
Emma Ruth Rundle – flute, guitar, layout, photography, piano, vocals 
Greg Burns – bass, layout, photography, synthesizer
JJ Golden – mastering at Golden Mastering 
Toshi Kasai – engineer, mixing at Entourage Studio

References

External links

2014 debut EPs
Marriages (band) albums
Sargent House albums